KGGV-LP (95.1 FM) was a non-commercial all volunteer community radio station broadcasting music, news, and discussion forums. Licensed to Guerneville, California, United States, the station is owned by Multi Media Educational Foundation.

References

External links
 

GGV-LP
GGV-LP
Mass media in Sonoma County, California
Community radio stations in the United States